Times-Union or Times Union may refer to:

Newspapers 

 Times Union (Albany), Albany, New York (under this name since 1891)
 Brooklyn Times-Union, Brooklyn, New York (1932–1937 under this name)
 The Florida Times-Union, Jacksonville, Florida (under that name since 1883)
 Rochester Times-Union, Rochester, New York (ceased publication 1997)
 Times-Union, Warsaw, Indiana (1854–present)

Buildings 

 Times Union Center, indoor arena in Albany
 Times-Union Center for the Performing Arts, Jacksonville

Other 

 New York Times Guild, the trade union of workers at The New York Times